Bjørn Ingebrigt Dyrdahl (born 27 April 1944) is a Norwegian luger. He was born in Trondheim as the son of Arnold Dyrdahl. He competed at the 1972 Winter Olympics in Sapporo, where he placed 30th in singles.

References

External links

1944 births
Living people
Sportspeople from Trondheim
Norwegian male lugers
Olympic lugers of Norway
Lugers at the 1972 Winter Olympics
Lugers at the 1976 Winter Olympics